Paolo Lorenzi was the defending champion but chose not to participate.

João Souza won the title after defeating Laslo Đere 6–4, 7–6(7–4) in the final.

Seeds

Draw

Finals

Top half

Bottom half

References
Main Draw
Qualifying Draw

International Tennis Tournament of Cortina - Singles